Estola rogueti is a species of beetle in the family Cerambycidae. It was described by Chalumeau and Touroult in 2005. It is known from Martinique.

References

Estola
Beetles described in 2005